Carlos Raúl Cantero Ojeda (born 11 November 1956) is a Chilean politician and geographer who served as member of the Senate of Chile.

References

External links
 BCN Profile

1956 births
Living people
Eduardo de la Barra Lyceum alumni
Catholic University of the North alumni
21st-century Chilean politicians
National Renewal (Chile) politicians
Amplitude (political party) politicians